Holden is a lake in the municipality of Steinkjer in Trøndelag county, Norway. The  lake has a dam on the southern end to control the water for hydroelectric power. The lake flows out into the Follaelva river which flows into the Trondheimsfjord at the village of Follafoss.

See also
List of lakes in Norway

References

Steinkjer
Lakes of Trøndelag
Reservoirs in Norway